Vital Viktaravich Hayduchyk (born 12 July 1989) is a Belarusian professional footballer.

Career
In the first half of 2017, he was loaned out to Greek Super League club Asteras Tripoli.

Hayduchyk was part of the Belarus U21 team that finished in 3rd place at the 2011 UEFA European Under-21 Football Championship. He made a substitute appearance in the 0:3 group stage loss against Switzerland U21. He was a member of the Belarus Olympic side that participated in the 2012 Toulon Tournament.

Honours
BATE Borisov
Belarusian Premier League champion: 2013, 2014, 2015, 2016, 2017
Belarusian Cup winner: 2014–15
Belarusian Super Cup winner: 2013, 2014, 2016

Sūduva
A Lyga champion: 2018

References

External links
Profile from BATE Borisov 

1989 births
Living people
Sportspeople from Brest, Belarus
Belarusian footballers
Association football defenders
Belarusian expatriate footballers
Expatriate footballers in Greece
Expatriate footballers in Lithuania
FC BATE Borisov players
FC Dynamo Brest players
Asteras Tripolis F.C. players
FK Sūduva Marijampolė players
FC Torpedo-BelAZ Zhodino players
FC Rukh Brest players